Gur-e Mar is a village in Balkh Province in northern Afghanistan.

On January 22, 2010, the construction was started of a 75 km rail link from Hairatan near the border with Uzbekistan to a terminal at Gur-e Mar. The project is contractually scheduled for completion by June 2011.

See also 
Balkh Province

References

External links 
Satellite map at Maplandia.com 

Populated places in Balkh Province